Ivan Rassimov (Born Ivan Đerasimović; Serbian Cyrillic: Иван Ђерасимовић) (7 May 1938 – 14 March 2003) was an Italian film actor of Serb descent who appeared in many horror and exploitation films.

Biography
Born in Trieste to Serbian parents, Velimir and Vera Đerasimović (née Petrijević), he attended the Slovenian scientific lyceum (Gimnazija s slovenskim učnim jezikom) in Trieste. He made his film debut in 1964 after graduating from university and Actors' Studio in Rome.  Mostly cast in villainous roles, he appeared in Mario Bava's Planet of the Vampires (1965), Sergio Martino's Your Vice Is a Locked Room and Only I Have the Key (1972), Umberto Lenzi's Man from Deep River (1972) and Eaten Alive! (1980), Mario Gariazzo's The Eerie Midnight Horror Show (1974), and Ruggero Deodato's Last Cannibal World (1977), among many other titles.

He retired from acting in 1987 and worked then for a publishing firm in Rome. He died on 13 May 2003, in a motorcycle accident.

Filmography

References

External links
 
 
Interview https://web.archive.org/web/20081227232632/http://www.rassimov.netfirms.com/IvanRassimov/IvanIV.htm

Italian male film actors
1938 births
2003 deaths
Italian people of Serbian descent
Actors from Trieste
Motorcycle road incident deaths
Road incident deaths in Italy